Renard is a settlement in Guadeloupe, on the island of Grande-Terre.  It is located to the west of Dubedou and Zevallos, and to the east of Boisvin; Guenette and Portland are to its north.

Populated places in Guadeloupe